The tenth season of Frasier originally aired from September 24, 2002, to May 20, 2003, on NBC. The opening title screen color was changed to silver.

Cast

Main
 Kelsey Grammer as Frasier Crane
 Jane Leeves as Daphne Crane
 David Hyde Pierce as Niles Crane
 Peri Gilpin as Roz Doyle
 John Mahoney as Martin Crane

Special appearance by
Bob Hoskins as Coach Fuller
Elvis Costello as Ben
Dr. Phil McGraw as himself

Special guest
Bebe Neuwirth as Lilith
Dan Butler as Bulldog
Harriet Sansom Harris as Bebe Glazer
Millicent Martin as Gertrude Moon
Saul Rubinek as Donny
Ana Gasteyer as Trish
Dean Cain as Rick
Felicity Huffman as Julia Wilcox
Brent Spiner as Albert
Jeanne Tripplehorn as Chelsea
Alan Cumming as Ahmrit
John Hannah as Avery McManus
David Ogden Stiers as Leland Barton

Recurring
Patrick Kerr as Noel
Tom McGowan as Kenny
Ashley Thomas as Alice
Edward Hibbert as Gil Chesterton

Guest
Sam Johnson as Reno Officiant
Conrad Janis as Albert
Zooey Deschanel as Jen
Trevor Einhorn as Frederick
Hal Sparks as Receptionist
Sarah Shahi as Reservationist
Mike Judge as Van
Paul F. Tompkins as Patient
Harve Presnell as Mike Shaw
Ann Cusack as Antonia
Dale Dickey as Mrs. Grant
Alex Borstein as Evelyn

Episodes

References 

2002 American television seasons
2003 American television seasons
Frasier 10